The 1968 American Football League season was the ninth regular season of the AFL, and its penultimate season prior to the AFL–NFL merger.

The season ended when the New York Jets (11–3) defeated the Oakland Raiders (12–2) in the AFL championship game on December 29 at Shea Stadium in New York City. Two weeks later, the Jets defeated the National Football League's Baltimore Colts in Super Bowl III in one of the biggest sports upsets in history.

The season was also notable as the inaugural season of the Cincinnati Bengals, which expanded the AFL to ten teams.

In anticipation of the merger, all AFL on-field officials wore uniforms similar to those used in the NFL.

Division races
With the addition of the Cincinnati Bengals, the AFL's ten teams were split equally into two divisions.  Each played a home-and-away game against the other four teams in its division, one game against each of the five teams in the opposite division, and a second game against one of the other division's teams.

As with the previous eight seasons, the best record in the Eastern Division played the best in the Western Division in the AFL championship game, with the site alternating between the divisions; the Eastern division hosted in even-numbered years.  If there was tie at the top of either division standings (as happened when Oakland and Kansas City both finished at 12–2), a one-game playoff was held to determine the division winner. The Jets, with the third-best record in the league in 1968, had a week off and hosted the title game.

Regular season
The Cincinnati Bengals joined the league as an expansion team.

Results

(*) Played at Legion Field, Birmingham, Alabama since Boston Red Sox refused to rent Fenway Park to Patriots.

Standings

Playoffs

Super Bowl

In an upset, the New York Jets, defeated the Baltimore Colts, 16–7, at Orange Bowl in Miami, on January 12, 1969.

Stadium changes
 The expansion Cincinnati Bengals began play at Nippert Stadium
 Bears Stadium, home of the Denver Broncos, was renamed Mile High Stadium after the city took control of the venue
 The Houston Oilers moved from Rice Stadium to the Astrodome

Coaching changes

Offseason
Cincinnati Bengals: Paul Brown was the expansion team's first head coach.

In-season
Buffalo Bills: Joe Collier was fired after two games. Defensive coordinator Harvey Johnson served as interim head coach.

References

External links
Football Database

 
American Football League seasons